Dellinger is a surname. Notable people with the surname include:

 Bill Dellinger (born 1934), US athlete
 David Dellinger (1915-2004), American pacifist and activist for nonviolent social change
 Hampton Dellinger, American politician, 2008 Democratic nomination for Lieutenant Governor of North Carolina
 John Howard Dellinger (1886-1962), American telecommunication engineer and vice chairman of Institute of Radio Engineers
 Matt Dellinger, US journalist of The New Yorker
 Rudolf Dellinger (1857-1910), German composer, Kapellmeister
 Walter Dellinger (1941–2022), US jurist, United States Solicitor General 1996–1997

Fictional
 Dellinger is a character in One Piece in who fights with kicks.

See also 
 Dillinger (surname)

German-language surnames